The discography of Sash!, a German DJ. In 1996, Sash! released "It's My Life", which became a European club hit. In 1997, with Sabine Ohmes as the singer, Sash! released "Encore Une Fois" which reached number two in the UK Singles Chart, as well as reaching the top 10 in many other countries. Follow-up singles "Ecuador" and "Stay", both also reached number two in the UK. In 1998, Sash! released the first single from his second album, "La Primavera", which reached number three, "Mysterious Times", which reached number two, and "Move Mania". The following year, "Colour the World" reached number fifteen.

In 2000, "Adelante" was released from the new album "Trilenium", and it reached number two. "Just Around the Hill" and "With My Own Eyes", were also released in that year. "Together Again" was the last single from the album, but was only released in Spain and Denmark. In 2002, Sash! released his fourth album S4 Sash!, which produced the singles "Ganbareh", "Run" (which featured Boy George), and "I Believe" (which had the vocals of TJ Davis). In 2007, Sash! released an album called 10th Anniversary which reached number nine on the UK Album Chart. In 2008 Sash! released "Raindrops (Encore Une Fois)", a collaboration with Stunt, and it reached number nine in the UK.

Albums

Studio albums

Compilation albums

Singles

References

Notes

Citations

Electronic music discographies
Discographies of German artists